Dato Jannie Chan Siew Lee (曾秀丽), also known by her married name, Jannie Tay, is a Singaporean entrepreneur and former president of the Singapore Retailers Association and the ASEAN Business Forum, in both cases the first woman to hold the position.

Chan earned a B.Sc. in physiology and an M.Sc. in pharmacology from Monash University in 1968 and 1971, and was a lecturer in both subjects at the National University of Singapore.

In 1979 she co-founded The Hour Glass Limited, a luxury watch retailer, with her husband, Henry Tay. , it had 41 stores in several countries; she was formerly executive vice-president and executive vice-chairman.

She founded the holding company Save Our Planet Investments (Hypha Holdings, 2005) and the non-profit Save Our Planet Foundation (2007), which works for reforestation to mitigate climate change. Her most recent company is Scientific Tradition Pte Ltd, which develops mushroom products based on traditional Chinese medicine.

Chan contributed to the 2006 book, Six Billion Minds: Managing Outsourcing in the Global Knowledge Economy. She is the first female president of the Singapore Retailers Association and of the ASEAN Business Forum, the first female executive board member of the Commonwealth Business Council and founder chairman of the Commonwealth Business Women Leaders' Network. She also serves on the first Business Advisory Council of the United Nations Office for Project Services (since 2000) and on the Business Advisory Council of the United Nations Economic and Social Commission for Asia and the Pacific (since 2004). She is active for women's rights: she was one of the organisers of the first Women Inspire exposition and business forum in Singapore in 2002 and was president of the Singapore chapter of WOW (Women for Other Women).

On 20 June 2019, Chan was declared bankrupt by the Singapore court for owing a moneylender over S$4 million in unpaid debt. 

Chan began serving a two-week prison sentence for contempt of court on 9 September 2019, after losing her appeal against a 2017 sentence judgment. 

On 15 October 2019, the Singapore High Court rules that Chan's forced sale of $3.85m apartment to be paid to Official Assignee.

Personal
Chan is of Hakka Chinese heritage; her father and grandfather were "sinsehs" (practitioners of traditional medicine). She has six siblings, four of whom became physicians.

Chan and her husband have three children, Audrey, Michael (who now manages The Hour Glass) and Sabrina. Their first child died in childhood. They divorced in 2010.

Awards 
 1989: Special Volunteer Award, Community Chest of Singapore 
 1996: Louis Feraud Les Honours award (Business category) 
 1999: Honorary doctorate, Oxford Brookes University
 1997: Leading Women Entrepreneurs of the World award, Paris 
 2003: Darjah Sultan Ahmad Shah Pahang, carrying the title Dato'
 2003: Distinguished Alumni Award, Monash University
 2009: APEA Woman Entrepreneur of the Year award, Enterprise Asia 
 2011 Lifetime Achievement for Outstanding Contribution to Tourism. Presented at Singapore Experience Awards.

Key Positions Held 
 1990: President, Women for Other Women Association (WOW)
 1997–1998: Director, International Women's Forum Leadership Foundation 
 1997–1999: Board Member, Women's Leadership Initiative Board, John F Kennedy School of Government, Harvard University 
 1998: President, ASEAN Business Forum 
 Jul 1999–Jul 2016: President, Singapore Retailers Association 
 2002: President, Women’s Business Connection 
 2002: Chairperson, Commonwealth Business Women Leaders network 
 2003: Founding member and Chairman, Retail Academy of Singapore 
 2004: Chairman, Retail Industry Skills and Training Council 
 2004: Member, United Nations ESCAP Business Advisory Council 
 2011: Chairman, Asia-Pacific Retailers Association

Personal life 
Chan was married to Henry Tay were married in 1969 and divorced in 2010. They have three children.

References

Living people
Singaporean women in business
Monash University alumni
Singaporean people of Hakka descent
Year of birth missing (living people)